2014 in sports describes the year's events in world sport.

Calendar by month

January

February

March

April

May

June

July

August

September

October

November

December

Alpine skiing

Amateur boxing

American football

 Super Bowl XLVIII – the Seattle Seahawks (NFC) won 43–8 over the Denver Broncos (AFC)
Location: MetLife Stadium
Attendance: 82,529
MVP: Malcolm Smith, LB (Seattle)

Aquatics

Archery
 January 24 – December 14: World Archery Official Website's Calendar 
 November 16, 2013 – February 9, 2014: 2013–14 Indoor Archery World Cup
 November 16 & 17, 2013, in  Marrakesh
 Host nation, and the  share both the gold and overall medals wins.
 December 8 & 9, 2013, in 
 The  won both the gold and overall medal tallies.
 January 24–26, 2014, in  Telford
  and the  have 2 gold medals each. However,  won the overall medal tally.
 February 7 – 9, 2014, in  Las Vegas (World Cup Final)
  won both the gold and overall medal tallies.
 February 25 – March 2: 2014 World Indoor Archery Championships at  Nîmes
  and  tied each other, with 3 gold medals. The  won the overall medal tally.
 April 22 – September 7: 2014 Archery World Cup
 April 22 – 27 in  Shanghai
 The  won both the gold and overall medal tallies.
 May 13 – 18 in  Medellín
  won both the gold and overall medal tallies.
 June 10–15 in  Antalya
  won both the gold and overall medal tallies.
 August 5–10 in  Wrocław
  and the  won 2 gold medals each. However,  and  won 5 overall medals each.
 September 6 & 7 in  Lausanne (final)
 The  won both the gold and overall medal tallies.
 July 21–26: 2014 European Archery Championships at  Echmiadzin
  won both the gold and overall medal tallies.
 August 19–24: 2014 World Archery Field Championships at  Zagreb
 The  won the gold medal tally.  won the overall medal tally.
 August 22–26: 2014 Summer Youth Olympics
  won 2 gold medals (including one at the mixed team event). China and  won 2 overall medals each.
 September 15–20: 2014 European 3D Championships at  Tallinn
  won both the gold and overall medal tallies.
 October 18–25: 2014 Pan American Archery Championships at  Rosario
  won both the gold and overall medal tallies.

Association football

 August 6, 2013 – April 23, 2014: 2013–14 CONCACAF Champions League (First leg of final at Estadio Azul stadium in Mexico City. Second leg at Estadio Nemesio Díez in Toluca.)
  Cruz Azul defeated fellow Mexican team Toluca on away goals after the final finished in a 1–1 draw on aggregate. Cruz Azu, which claimed its sixth title, would represent CONCACAF at the 2014 FIFA Club World Cup.
 August 8, 2013 – May 22, 2014: 2013–14 UEFA Women's Champions League (final at Estádio do Restelo in Lisbon)
  Wolfsburg defeated  Tyresö 4–3 to claim its second consecutive title and second overall.
 September 17, 2013 – May 24, 2014: 2013–14 UEFA Champions League (final at Estádio da Luz in Lisbon)
  Real Madrid defeated crosstown rival Atlético Madrid 4–1 after extra time to claim its 10th title. Real Madrid would represent UEFA at the 2014 FIFA Club World Cup.
 September 19, 2013 – May 14, 2014: 2013–14 UEFA Europa League (final at Juventus Stadium in Turin)
  Sevilla defeated  Benfica 4–2 in a penalty shootout after a scoreless draw following extra time. Sevilla claimed its third Europa League title.
 October 15, 2013 – May 18, 2014: 2013–14 OFC Champions League (First leg of final at  Port Vila Municipal Stadium. Second leg at  Kiwitea Street in Auckland)
  Auckland City defeated  Amicale 3–2 on aggregate to claim its sixth title. Auckland City would represent the OFC at the 2014 FIFA Club World Cup.
 January 28 – August 13: 2014 Copa Libertadores (First leg of final at Estadio Defensores del Chaco in  Asunción; second leg at Estadio Pedro Bidegain in  Buenos Aires)
  San Lorenzo defeated  Nacional, 2–1 on aggregate, to claim its first Copa Libertadores title. San Lorenzo would represent CONMEBOL at the 2014 FIFA Club World Cup.
 January 29 – November 1: 2014 AFC Champions League (First leg of final at Parramatta Stadium in  Sydney; second leg at King Fahd International Stadium in  Riyadh)
  Western Sydney Wanderers FC defeated  Al-Hilal FC, 1–0 in aggregate, to win its first AFC Champions League title. Western Sydney Wanderers would represent the AFC at the 2014 FIFA Club World Cup.
 February 7 – November 2: 2014 CAF Champions League (First leg of final at Stade Tata Raphaël in  Kinshasa; second leg at Stade Mustapha Tchaker in  Blida)
  ES Sétif defeated  AS Vita Club, via the away goals rule after the tied score of 3–3 in aggregate, to claim its second CAF Champions League title. ES Sétif would represent the CAF at the 2014 FIFA Club World Cup.
 March 15 – April 4: 2014 FIFA U-17 Women's World Cup in Costa Rica (final at Estadio Nacional in San José)
  defeated , 2–0, to claim its first title.  took third place in this tournament defeating .
 June 13 – July 13: 2014 FIFA World Cup in Brazil (final at Estádio do Maracanã in Rio de Janeiro)
  defeated , 1–0 after extra time, to claim its fourth FIFA World Cup title. The  took third place.
 August 5–24: 2014 FIFA U-20 Women's World Cup in Canada (final at Olympic Stadium in Montreal)
  defeated , 1–0 in extra time, to claim its third U20 World Cup title.  took third place.
 August 12: 2014 UEFA Super Cup at Cardiff City Stadium in Wales
  Real Madrid defeated fellow Spanish side Sevilla, 2–0, to claim its second UEFA Super Cup win.
 August 14–27: 2014 Summer Youth Olympics
 Boys:  ;  ;  
 Girls:  ;  ;  
 December 10–20: 2014 FIFA Club World Cup in 
  Real Madrid defeated  San Lorenzo, 2–0, to claim its first FIFA Club World Cup title.  Auckland City took third place.

Athletics

Badminton
 January 7 – December 28: 2014 BWF Calendar of Events
 January 7 – December 21: 2014 BWF Super Series
  won the gold tally.
  won the gold medal tally.
  and  won 2 gold medals each.
  and  won 2 gold medals each.
  won the gold medal tally.
  won the gold medal tally.
  and  won 2 gold medals each.
  and  won 2 gold medals each.
  won all the gold medals.
  won the gold medal tally.
 Both  and  won 2 gold medals each.
  won the gold medal tally.
  won the gold medal tally.
 January 21 – December 13: 2014 BWF Grand Prix Gold and Grand Prix
  won the gold medal tally.
  won the gold medal tally.
  won the gold medal tally.
 March 25–30: YONEX-SUNRISE Malaysia Grand Prix Gold in  Johor Bahru
  won the gold medal tally.
  won the gold medal tally.
  won the gold medal tally.
  won the gold medal tally.
 July 8–13 at  2014 YONEX Suffolk County Community College U.S. Open Badminton Championships in New York City
  won the gold medal tally.
  and  won 2 gold medals each.
  won the gold medal tally.
  won the gold medal tally.
  won the gold medal tally.
 Host nation, won the gold medal tally.
 Note: An event in London was scheduled to take place from September 30 to October 5, but it was cancelled.
 Five different nations won one gold medal each.
  won the gold medal tally.
 Host nation, won the gold medal tally.
 Five different nations won one gold medal each.
 November 25–30 at 
  won the gold medal tally.
 December 8–13 (2014 K&D Graphics / Yonex Grand Prix) at  Orange, California (final)
  won the gold medal tally.
 February 10 – 15: 2014 Oceania Badminton Championships at  Ballarat
 Host nation, won the gold medal tally.
 February 11 – 16: 2014 European Men's and Women's Team Badminton Championships at  Basel
 Men's Team Winners: 
 Women's Team Winners: 
 April 7 – 18: 2014 BWF World Junior Championships at  Alor Setar
  won both the gold and overall medal tallies.
 April 22 – 27: 2014 Badminton Asia Championships in  Gimcheon
  and  had won 2 gold medals each. China won the overall medal tally.
 April 23 – 27: 2014 European Badminton Championships at  Kazan
  won both the gold and overall medal tallies.
 April 23 – 29: 2014 African Badminton Championships at  Gaborone
  won the gold medal tally.
 May 18 – 25: 2014 Thomas & Uber Cup at  New Delhi
  defeated , 3–2, to claim its first Thomas Cup win.
  defeated , 3–1, to claim its 13th Uber Cup win.
 June 24–28: 2014 BWF European Club Championships in  Amiens
  Primorye Vladivostok defeated  BC Chambly Oise, 4–1 (in matches won), to claim its third consecutive European Club Championship win. Both  TJ Sokol Vesely Jehnice and  AIX Universite teams won a bronze medal each.
 August 17–22: 2014 Summer Youth Olympics
 Boys' Singles:   SHI Yuqi;   LIN Guipu;   Anthony Sinisuka Ginting
 Girls' Singles:   HE Bingjiao;   Akane Yamaguchi;   Busanan Ongbamrungphan
 Mixed Doubles:   June Wei Cheam /  NG Tsz Yau;   Kanta Tsuneyama /  LEE Chia-Hsin;   ANGODA VIDANALAGE S.P.D. /  HE Bingjiao
 August 25–31: 2014 BWF World Championships in  Copenhagen
  won both the gold and overall medal tallies.

Bandy

Baseball

 March 22 – September 28: 2014 Major League Baseball season
 May 30: 2014 Civil Rights Game (Houston Astros vs. Baltimore Orioles) at Minute Maid Park in Houston
  Houston Astros defeated the  Baltimore Orioles 2–1.
 May 30 – June 25: 2014 NCAA Division I baseball tournament (2014 College World Series on June 14–25 at TD Ameritrade Park in Omaha, Nebraska)
 The  Vanderbilt Commodores defeated the  Virginia Cavaliers 2–1 in the best-of-three-games final series to claim the school's first NCAA title in any men's sport.
 July 15: 2014 Major League Baseball All-Star Game at Target Field in Minneapolis
 The American League defeated the National League, with the score of 5–3.
 July 23–30: 2014 Big League World Series at Easley, South Carolina
 The Southeast Team (from  Clearwater) defeated Team , 2–1, in the final match.
 July 29 – August 4: 2014 Little League Intermediate World Series at Livermore, California
 Team West ( Nogales National LL) defeated Team  (Samaritana LL, San Lorenzo) 11–4 in the final match.
 August 1–10: 2014 WBSC U15 Baseball World Cup in the state of  Baja California Sur. Cabo San Lucas, Ciudad Constitución, and La Paz will each play a role in this World Cup.
 August 9–16: 2014 Junior League World Series at Taylor, Michigan
 Team Asia-Pacific (represented by the Chung-shan JLL team from  Taichung) defeated Team USA Southwest (represented by the Oil Belt All-Stars team from  Corpus Christi), 9–1, in the final match.
 August 9–16: 2014 Senior League World Series at Bangor, Maine
 Team USA Southwest (represented by the West University L.L. team from  Houston) defeated Team Latin America (represented by the Pariba L.L. team from  Willemstad), 7–4, to claim its second Senior League World Series title.
 August 14–24: 2014 Little League World Series in South Williamsport, Pennsylvania
 Team Asia-Pacific (represented by the Seoul LL from ) defeated Team Great Lakes (represented by the Jackie Robinson West LL from  Chicago), 8–4, in the final match.
 September 1–7: 2014 WBSC Women's Baseball World Cup in  Miyazaki
 The  defeated , 6–3, to win its 21st European Baseball Championship title.  took the bronze medal.
 October 21–29: 2014 World Series
 The  San Francisco Giants defeated the  Kansas City Royals, 4–3 in games, to claim its eighth World Series title.
 MVP of the series:  Madison Bumgarner, of the San Francisco Giants.
 November 7–16: 2014 WBSC U21 Baseball World Cup in  Taichung
  defeated , 9–0, to win the inaugural IBAF's U21 Baseball World Cup.

Basketball

 October 1, 2013 – April 11, 2014: 2013–14 Euroleague
 April 15 – 25: 2013–14 Euroleague Quarter-finals
 May 16 – 18: 2013–14 Euroleague Final Four at the Mediolanum Forum in  Milan
  Maccabi Tel Aviv defeated  Real Madrid, 98–86, to claim its sixth title.
 October 15, 2013 – February 19, 2014: 2013–14 Eurocup Basketball
 March 4 – May 7: 2013–14 Eurocup Basketball Knockout Stage
  Valencia BC defeated  Unics Kazan, 165–140, to claim its third title.
 October 24, 2013 – April 27, 2014: 2013–14 EuroChallenge
  Grissin Bon Reggio Emilia defeated  Triumph Lyubertsy, 79–65, to claim its first title.
 October 29, 2013 – April 16, 2014: 2013–14 NBA season
 The  San Antonio Spurs won the most regular-season games. Kevin Durant, of the  Oklahoma City Thunder, was the top scorer for this season.
 April 19 – June 15: 2014 NBA Playoffs
 The  San Antonio Spurs defeated the  Miami Heat, 4–1 (in games won), to claim its fifth NBA title.
  Kawhi Leonard (of the San Antonio Spurs) was the MVP of this year's NBA finals.
 November 6, 2013 – March 28, 2014: 2013–14 EuroCup Women
  Dynamo Moscow defeated fellow Russian team, the Dynamo Kursk, 158–150, to claim its third title.
 November 6, 2013 – April 13, 2014: 2013–14 EuroLeague Women (Final four playoffs at  Yekaterinburg)
 The  Galatasaray team defeated fellow Turkish team, Fenerbahçe, 69–58, to win its first title.
 January 24 – March 22: 2014 FIBA Americas League
  Flamengo defeated fellow Brazilian Pinheiros team, 85–78, to win its first FIBA Americas League title.  Aguada took the bronze medal.
 February 16: 2014 NBA All-Star Game at Smoothie King Center in New Orleans
 The Eastern Conference defeated the Western Conference 163–155.  Kyrie Irving of the  Cleveland Cavaliers was named MVP.
 March 18 – April 7: 2014 NCAA Division I Men's Basketball Tournament (Final Four at AT&T Stadium in Arlington, Texas)
 The  Connecticut Huskies defeated the  Kentucky Wildcats, 60–54, to claim its fourth NCAA title.
 March 22 – April 8: 2014 NCAA Division I Women's Basketball Tournament (Final Four at Bridgestone Arena in Nashville, Tennessee)
 The  Connecticut Huskies defeated the  Notre Dame Fighting Irish, 79–58, to claim its ninth NCAA title.
 May 16 – August 17: 2014 WNBA season
 The  Phoenix Mercury won the most regular-season games.  Maya Moore, of the  Minnesota Lynx, was the top scorer for this season.
 August 21 – September 12: 2014 WNBA Playoffs
 The  Phoenix Mercury swept the  Chicago Sky 3–0 in the best-of-5 final series. It is the Mercury's third league title.
 June 5–8: 2014 FIBA 3x3 World Championships in  Moscow
 Men:  defeated , 18–13, to claim its first title. Host nation, took third place.
 Women: The  defeated host nation, 15–8, to win its second consecutive title.  took third place.
 June 20–24: 2014 FIBA U18 Americas Championship in  Colorado Springs
The  wins the bronze medal.
 June 28 – July 6: 2014 FIBA U17 World Championship for Women in  Klatovy and Plzeň
 The  defeated , 77–75, to claim its third consecutive FIBA U17 title.  took third place.
 July 8–20: 2014 FIBA Europe Under-20 Championship in  Crete
  defeated , 65–57, to claim its first FIBA U20 title.  took the bronze medal.
 July 19: 2014 WNBA All-Star Game at US Airways Center in  Phoenix
 The Eastern Conference defeated the Western Conference 125–124 in overtime.  Shoni Schimmel of the  Atlanta Dream was named MVP.
 July 19 – October 12: 2014 FIBA 3x3 World Tour
 July 19 & 20 in  Manila
  Manila West team defeated  Team Doha, 21–17, to claim its first win.
 August 2 & 3 in  Beijing
 Team  Wukesong defeated Team  Nagoya, 21–10, to claim its first win.
 August 15 & 16 in  Chicago
 Team  Saskatoon defeated Team  Denver, 18–17, to claim its first win.
 August 23 & 24 in  Prague
 Team  Novi Sad defeated Team  Bucharest, 16–14, to claim its first win.
 August 29 & 30 in  Lausanne
 Team  Trbovlje defeated fellow Slovenian Team Kranj, 17–16, to claim its first win.
 September 27 & 28 in  Rio de Janeiro
 Team  São Paulo defeated fellow Brazilian Team Santos, 21–12, to claim its first win.
 October 11 & 12 in  Tokyo (final)
 Team  Novi Sad defeated Team  Saskatoon, 21–11, to claim its second win.
 July 22–26: 2014 Centrobasket Championship for Women in  Monterrey
  defeated , 58–47, to claim its 16th Centrobasket title. The  won the bronze medal.
 August 1–7: 2014 Centrobasket Championship for Men in  Nayarit
 Host nation, defeated , 74–60, to claim its third Centrobasket title. The  took third place.
 August 6–10: 2014 FIBA Americas Under-18 Championship for Women in  Colorado Springs
 The  defeated , 104–74, to claim its eighth Americas U18 title.  won the bronze medal.
 August 8–16: 2014 FIBA Under-17 World Championship in  Dubai
 The  defeated , 99–92, to claim its third FIBA U17 title.  won the bronze medal.
 August 18–26: 2014 Summer Youth Olympics
 Boys' Dunk Contest:   Karim Mouliom;   Ziga Lah;   FU Lei
 Girls' Shoot-out Contest:   Lucia Togores Carpintero;   Ela Micunovic;   Katie Lou Samuelson
 Boys' 3x3:  ;  ;  
 Girls' 3x3:  ;  ;  
 August 19–28: 2014 FIBA Asia Under-18 Championship in  Doha
  defeated , 66–48, to claim its tenth Asia U18 Championship title.  took the bronze medal.
 The  United States defeated  129–92 to claim its fifth FIBA Basketball World Cup title.  took the bronze medal.
 September 5–7: 2014 FIBA Europe 3x3 Championships in  Bucharest
 Men: Host nation, defeated , 18–16, to claim its first Europe 3x3 Championship title.  took third place.
 Women:  defeated , 16–13, to claim its first Europe 3x3 Championship title.  took third place.
 September 26–28: 2014 FIBA Intercontinental Cup in  Rio de Janeiro
  Flamengo defeated  Maccabi Tel Aviv, 156–146 in two matches, to win its first FIBA Intercontinental Cup title.
 September 27 – October 5: 2014 FIBA World Championship for Women in  Istanbul and Ankara (final at Ülker Sports Arena, Istanbul)
 The  defeated , 77–64, to claim its ninth FIBA Women's World Championship title.  took the bronze medal.
 October 10–17: 2014 FIBA Asia Under-18 Championship for Women in  Amman
  defeated , 60–53, to claim its 14th FIBA Asia U18 Women's Championship title.  took the bronze medal.
 December 12: 2014 FIBA 3x3 All Stars in  Doha
 Team  Novi Sad defeated Team  Doha, 20–12, in the final match.

Beach soccer
 January 3 – December 14: Beach Soccer Worldwide Calendar of Events
 January 3–5: 2014 Copa América Beach Soccer at  Recife
 Host nation, defeated  10–1 to claim its tenth title.
 February 13 – 15: 2014 Copa San Luis Futbol Playa at  Merlo
  defeated host nation, 2–0.
 April 11 – 13: Copa Pílsener Fútbol Playa 2014 at  San Salvador
  is the overall winner, having won all its matches.
 May 16 – 18: 2014 Riviera Maya Cup at  Playa del Carmen
  is the overall winner, having won all its matches.
 June 3–8: 2014 Euro Winners Cup at  Catania
 's BSC Kristall team defeated 's Milano BS team, 2–0. 's S.C. Braga team took third place.
 June 6–8: 2014 North American Sand Soccer Championship in  Virginia Beach
  defeated 's C.D. Nacional, with the score of 3–2. ' Rush BSC, Ohio, took third place.
 June 12–24: 2014 ITV Fever Pitch in  Manchester
 Click here for the ITV Fever Pitch news.
 June 13–15: 2014 İstanbul Cup in 
 's FC Lokomotiv Moscow defeated 's Beşiktaş J.K., to claim its second title.
 June 20 – August 17: 2014 Euro Beach Soccer League
 June 20–22 in  Catania
 Group 1 winner: 
 Group 2 winner: 
 June 27–29 in  Sopot
 Group 1 winner: 
 Group 2 winner: 
 July 11–13 in  Moscow
 Division B winners:  and 
 August 8–10 in  Siófok
 Division A winners: 
 Division B (Group 1) winners: 
 Division B (Group 2) winners: 
 August 14–17: Promotional Final and the Superfinal in  Torredembarra
 Promotion Final:  defeated , 6–4, to win this event.
 Superfinal:  defeated host nation, 4–3, to win this event.
 July 19 & 20: 2014 Beach Soccer Nations Cup in  Linz
  defeated , 6–5, in the final match.
 July 25–27: 2014 Mundialito at  Vila Nova de Gaia
  defeated , 8–2, to claim its fifth Mundialito win.  took third place.
 August 22–24: Tour El Jadida 2014 in 
 Host nation, took first place, by winning both matches against the United Arab Emirates and Switzerland.
 August 28–31: 2014 Euro Beach Soccer Cup in  Baku
  defeated , 8–6, in the final match.  took third place.
 November 4–8: 2014 Samsung Beach Soccer Intercontinental Cup in  Dubai
  defeated , 3–2 at extra time, to win its first Intercontinental Cup title.  took third place.
 December 12–14: 2014 Copa Lagos in 
 Champions: ; Second: ; Third:

Beach volleyball

Biathlon

BMX racing (supercross)

Bobsleigh and skeleton

Boxing

Canadian football
 June 26 – November 8: 2014 CFL season
 West Division CFL season winners:  Calgary Stampeders
 East Division CFL season winners:  Hamilton Tiger-Cats
 November 29: 2014 Vanier Cup at Percival Molson Memorial Stadium in Montreal
 The  Montreal Carabins defeated the  McMaster Marauders, 20–19, to claim its first Vanier Cup win.
 November 30: 102nd Grey Cup at BC Place in Vancouver
 The  Calgary Stampeders defeated the  Hamilton Tiger-Cats, 20–16, to claim the team's seventh Grey Cup win.

Canoeing

Cricket
 February 9 – March 1: 2014 ICC Under-19 Cricket World Cup in the United Arab Emirates
 Winners:  (first title). Second: . Third: .
 March 16 – April 6: 2014 ICC World Twenty20 and 2014 ICC Women's World Twenty20 together in Bangladesh
 Men's winners:  (first title). Second: . Third: 
 Women's winners:  (third consecutive title). Finalist:

Cross-country skiing

Curling

Cyclo-cross biking

Equestrianism

Fencing

Figure skating

Flatwater (canoe) sprint

Floorball
 Men's World Floorball Championships
 Champion: 
 Women's under-19 World Floorball Championships
 Champion: 
 Champions Cup
 Men's champion:  IBF Falun
 Women's champion:  Djurgårdens IF IBF

Freestyle skiing

Futsal
 August 27, 2013 – April 27, 2014: 2013–14 UEFA Futsal Cup
  FC Barcelona defeated  Dinamo Moskva, 5–2 in extra time, to claim its second UEFA Futsal Cup title.  Araz Naxçivan took third place.
 January 28 – February 8: UEFA Futsal Euro 2014 in 
  defeated  3–1, to claim its second title.
 April 21 – 27: 2014 Sudamericano de Clubes de Futsal – Zona Sur
  Atlántico Erechim defeated  Boca Juniors (futsal), 3–2.
 April 30 – May 10: 2014 AFC Futsal Championship in 
  defeated , 3–0 in penalties, to claim its third title.
 August 12–16: 2014 Oceanian Futsal Championship in  Païta
  won first place overall in this tournament and claimed its first OFS title. There is no knockout phase for this event.
 August 25–30: 2014 AFC Futsal Club Championship (finals) in  Chengdu
  Nagoya Oceans defeated  Chonburi Blue Wave, 5–4 in extra time, to claim its second AFC Futsal Club title.  Dabiri Tabriz took third place.
 September 17–28: 2014 AFF Futsal Championship in 
  defeated , 6–0, to claim its tenth AFF Futsal Championship title.  took third place.

Golf

Men
 October 10, 2013 – September 14, 2014: 2014 PGA Tour

Major championships
 April 10 – 13: 2014 Masters Tournament
 Winner:  Bubba Watson (Second Masters and Major win; sixth PGA Tour win)
 June 12–15: 2014 U.S. Open
 Winner:  Martin Kaymer (Second Major win and first U.S. Open win; 21st professional win; third PGA Tour win)
 July 17–20: 2014 Open Championship
 Winner:  Rory McIlroy (Third major win and first British Open win; 7th PGA Tour win)
 August 7–10: 2014 PGA Championship
 Winner:  Rory McIlroy (Fourth major win and second PGA Championship; 9th PGA Tour win)

WGC
 February 19 – 23: 2014 WGC-Accenture Match Play Championship
 Winner:  Jason Day (second PGA Tour win)
 March 6–9: 2014 WGC-Cadillac Championship
 Winner:  Patrick Reed (third PGA Tour win)
 July 31 – August 3: 2014 WGC-Bridgestone Invitational
 Winner:  Rory McIlroy (eighth PGA Tour win)
 November 6–9: 2014 WGC-HSBC Champions
 Winner:  Bubba Watson (seventh PGA Tour win)
Other
 May 22–25: BMW PGA Championship
 Winner:  Rory McIlroy (first BMW PGA Championship win, sixth European Tour win)
 September 26–28: 2014 Ryder Cup at the PGA Centenary Course near  Auchterarder
  Team Europe defeated  Team USA, 16½–11½, to claim its third consecutive and tenth overall Ryder Cup win.

Women
 January 23 – November 23: 2014 LPGA Tour

Major championships
 April 3 – 6: 2014 Kraft Nabisco Championship
 Winner:  Lexi Thompson (first major win; fourth LPGA Tour win)
 June 19–22: 2014 U.S. Women's Open
 Winner:  Michelle Wie (first major win; fourth LPGA Tour win)
 July 10–13: 2014 Women's British Open
 Winner:  Mo Martin (first major win; first LPGA Tour win)
 August 14–17: 2014 LPGA Championship
 Winner:  Inbee Park (second LPGA Championship win; fifth major win; 11th LGPA Tour win)
 September 11–14: 2014 Evian Championship
 Winner:  Kim Hyo-joo (first major and LPGA Tour win)

Other
 July 21–27: 2014 International Crown at Caves Valley Golf Club in  Owings Mills, Maryland (debut event)
  wins the inaugural International Crown event.

Other
 August 19–26: 2014 Summer Youth Olympics
 Boys' Individual:  #1  Jonas Liebich;  #2  Renato Paratore;   Oliver Lindell
 Note: Two gold medals awarded here. Therefore, no silver medal was awarded.
 Girls' Individual:   LEE Soyoung;   CHENG Ssu-Chia;   Emily Kristine Pedersen

Gymnastics

Handball
 August 24, 2013 – June 1, 2014: 2013–14 EHF Champions League
 March 20 – April 27: 2013–14 EHF Champions League knockout stage
 May 31 & June 1: 2014 Men's Champions League Final Four in  Cologne
  Flensburg defeated fellow German team, THW Kiel, 30–28, to claim its first title.
 October 5, 2013 – May 4, 2014: 2013–14 EHF Women's Champions League
 February 1 – March 16: 2013–14 EHF Women's Champions League Main Round
 May 3 & 4: 2013–14 EHF Women's Champions League Final Four in  Budapest
  Győri Audi ETO KC defeated  ŽRK Budućnost, 27–21, to win its second title.
 January 12–26: 2014 European Men's Handball Championship in 
  defeated the hosts, 41–32 to claim its third title.  took third place.
 January 25 – February 6: 2014 Asian Men's Handball Championship in 
  defeated the hosts, 27–26 to claim its first title.  took third place.
 February 8 – May 18: 2013–14 EHF Cup (final four in  Berlin)
  Pick Szeged defeated  Montpellier, 29–28, to claim its first title.
 April 25 & 26: 2014 Oceania Handball Championship in  Auckland
  defeated host nation, 54–36, to claim its eighth title.
 June 22–29: 2014 Pan American Men's Handball Championship in  Canelones
  defeated , 30–19, to claim its third consecutive and sixth time overall Pan American title.  took third place.
 June 28 – July 13: 2014 Women's Junior World Handball Championship in 
  defeated , 34–27, to claim its first IHF junior title.  took third place.
 July 20 – August 3: 2014 Women's Youth World Handball Championship in 
  defeated , 32–21, to claim its first Women's Youth World Handball Championship win.  took the bronze medal.
 July 22–27: 2014 Beach Handball World Championships in  Recife
 Men:  defeated , 2–1, to claim its fourth beach handball WC win.  took third place.
 Women:  defeated , 2–0, to claim its third beach handball WC win.  took third place.
 July 24 – August 3: 2014 European Men's Junior Handball Championship in 
  defeated , 26–24, to claim its third Men's Junior Handball Championship win.  took the bronze medal.
 August 2–14: 2014 Asian Men's Junior Handball Championship in  Tabriz
  defeated , 29–28, to claim its third consecutive and fourth overall Asian Men's Junior Handball title.  took the bronze medal.
 August 14–24: 2014 European Men's Youth Handball Championship in 
  defeated , 33–30, to claim its first European youth handball title.  took the bronze medal.
 August 20–25: 2014 Summer Youth Olympics
 Boys:  ;  ;  
 Girls:  ;  ;  
 September 5–15: 2014 Asian Men's Youth Handball Championship in  Amman
  defeated , 26–25, to claim its second Asian Men's Youth Handball title.  took third place.
 September 8–14: 2014 IHF Super Globe in  Doha
  FC Barcelona defeated  Al Sadd, 34–26, to claim its second IHF Super Globe title.  Flensburg-Handewitt took third place.
 November 29 – December 12: 2014 Asian Club League Handball Championship in  Doha
  El Jaish SC defeated fellow Qatari team, Lekhwiya, 33–30, to claim its second consecutive Asian Club League Handball Championship title.  Al-Qurain took third place.
  defeated , 28–25, to claim its sixth European Women's Handball Championship title.  took third place.

Field hockey
 January 3 – December 2014: 2014 FIH Calendar of Events
 January 10–18: 2012–13 Men's FIH Hockey World League Final in  New Delhi
  defeated  7–2 to claim its first title.
 May 31 – June 15: 2014 Men's Hockey World Cup and 2014 Women's Hockey World Cup together in  The Hague
 Women: The  defeated , 2–0, to claim its seventh title.  took third place.
 August 17–27: 2014 Summer Youth Olympics
 Boys:  ;  ;  
 Girls:  ;  ;  
 November 29 – December 7: 2014 Women's Hockey Champions Trophy in  San Miguel de Tucumán
  defeated , 3–1 in penalties (after a 1–1 tie in regular time), to claim its sixth Women's Hockey Champions Trophy title. The  took third place.
 December 6–14: 2014 Men's Hockey Champions Trophy in  Bhubaneshwar
  defeated , 2–0, to win its tenth Men's Hockey Champions Trophy title.  took third place.

Ice hockey

Roller hockey
 April 17 – 19: 2014 Latin Cup at  Viana do Castelo Municipality
 Host nation, defeated  in the final 3–2.  defeated  6–1.
 July 14–19: 2014 CERH European Championship at  Alcobendas
 Champions: ; Second: ; Third: 
 August 24–30: 2014 CERH European Roller Hockey U-17 Championship at  Gujan-Mestras
  defeated , 1–0, to claim its fifth European U17 Roller Hockey title.  took the bronze medal.
 October 6–14: 2014 CERH European U-20 Roller Hockey Championship at  Valongo
 Host nation, defeated , 3–2, to claim its fourth consecutive and 18th European U20 roller hockey title.  won the bronze medal.
 October 25 – November 1: 2014 FIRS Women's Roller Hockey World Cup at  Tourcoing
  defeated host nation, to claim their fifth FIRS Women's Roller Hockey World Cup title.  took the bronze medal.

Judo

Lacrosse
 December 28, 2013 – April 26, 2014: 2014 NLL season
 The Edmonton Rush won the most matches overall for this season.
 Cody Jamieson, of the Rochester Knighthawks, was the top scorer for the 2014 NLL season.
 May 3 – 31: 2014 NLL Champion's Cup playoffs
 The Rochester Knighthawks defeated the Calgary Roughnecks, 2–1, to claim its third consecutive Champion's Cup win. Overall, this win is the fifth one for the Knighthawks. Dan Dawson was named MVP for these playoffs.
 May 9 – 25: 2014 NCAA Division I Women's Lacrosse Championship
 The Maryland Terrapins, in their final game as a member of the Atlantic Coast Conference, defeated a fellow ACC team, the Syracuse Orange, 15–12 in the final at Johnny Unitas Stadium in Towson, Maryland to claim their 11th national title.
 May 7 – 26: 2014 NCAA Division I Men's Lacrosse Championship
 In another all-ACC final, the Duke Blue Devils defeated the Notre Dame Fighting Irish 11–9 at M&T Bank Stadium in Baltimore to claim their second consecutive national title and third overall.
 July 10–19: 2014 World Lacrosse Championship in Denver
  defeated the  8–5, to claim its third world championship title.  took third place.

Luge

Modern pentathlon

Motorsport

Mountain biking

Multi-sport events
 January 18–29: 2014 Lusophony Games was held in  Goa
 Host nation, won both the gold and overall medal tallies.
 March 7–18: 2014 South American Games was held in  Santiago
  won both the gold and overall medal tallies.
 March 15–22: 2014 Arctic Winter Games was held in  Fairbanks
 Host contingent, won both the gold and overall medal tallies.
 May 14 – 24: 2014 South American Beach Games was held in  Vargas
 Host nation, won both the gold and overall medal tallies.
 May 22 – 31: 2014 African Youth Games was held in  Gaborone
  won the gold medal tally.  won the overall medal tally.
 July 20–29: 2014 Micronesian Games was held in  Pohnpei
  won the gold medal tally, with 42 of them. The FSM state of  won the overall medal tally, with 114 medals.
 July 23 – August 3: 2014 Commonwealth Games was held in  Glasgow
  won both the gold and overall medal tallies, with 58 and 174 respectively.
 August 9–16: 2014 Gay Games was held in  Cleveland
 Click here for the sporting events contested in these Games. Choose an event and then click on the Results link within that sport's description page.
 September 18 – October 4: 2014 Asian Games was held in  Incheon
  won both the gold and overall medal tallies, with 151 and 342 medals respectively.
 November 14–23: 2014 Asian Beach Games was held in  Phuket
 Host nation, won both the gold and overall medal tallies.
 November 15–30: 2014 Central American and Caribbean Games was held in  Veracruz
  won the gold medal tally. Host nation, won the overall medal tally.
 December 11–17: 2014 SportAccord World Mind Games will be held in  Beijing
 Host nation, and  won 6 gold medals each. China won the overall medal tally.

Nordic combined

Olympic Games 
 February 7 – 23: 2014 Winter Olympics was held in  Sochi
 Host nation, won both the gold and overall medal tallies, with 13 and 33 medals respectively. However, Russia was later stripped of 11 medals due to the Russian doping scandal.
 August 16–28: 2014 Summer Youth Olympics was held in  Nanjing
 Host nation, won both the gold and overall medal tallies, with 38 and 65 medals respectively.

Paralympic Games
 March 7–16: 2014 Winter Paralympics was held in  Sochi
 March 8–16: Alpine Skiing
 Host nation, and  won 6 gold medals each. However, Russia won the overall medal tally.
 March 8–14: Biathlon
 Host nation, won both the gold and overall medal tallies.
 March 9–16: Cross-country skiing
 Host nation, won both the gold and overall medal tallies.
 March 8–15: Ice sledge hockey
  ;  ;  
 March 8–15: Wheelchair curling
  ;  ;  
  won the gold and overall medal tallies, with 30 and 80 medals respectively.

Paralympic sports
 August 22, 2013 – April 6, 2014: IPC Alpine Skiing Calendar
 February 22 – August 25: 2014 IPC Athletics Grand Prix
 February 22 – 25: 6th FAZZA International Athletics Competition in  Dubai
 April 14 – 16: The 2nd China Open Athletics Championships in  Beijing
 April 24 – 26: II Caixa Loterias Athletics and Swimming Open Championships in  São Paulo
 April 5 – 11: 2014 IPC Powerlifting World Championships in  Dubai
  won the gold medal tally.  won the overall medal tally.
 April 10 – 13: 2014 UCI Para-cycling Track World Championships in  Aguascalientes
 Men:  won the gold medal tally.  won the overall medal tally.
 Women:  won the gold medal tally.  won the overall medal tally.
 Open winner: ; Second: ; Third: 
 April 13: 2014 IPC Athletics Marathon World Cup in  London
 Men:  El Amin Chentouf
 Women:  Maria Paredes Rodriguez
 May 26 – June 1: BNP Baripas World Team Cup (wheelchair tennis) in  Alphen aan den Rijn
 Men's World Cup winner:  (sixth title)
 Women's World Cup winner:  (27th title)
 Quad winner:  (fourth title)
 Junior World Team Cup winner:  (first title)
 June 20–28: IWBF 2014 Women's World Wheelchair Basketball Championship in  Toronto
 Host nation, defeated , 54–50, to claim its fifth title. The  won the bronze medal.
 June 21 & 22: 2014 WTF World Para-Taekwondo Championships in  Moscow
 Men's overall winners: 
 Women's overall winners: 
 July 1–14: 2014 IWBF Wheelchair Basketball World Championship for Men in  Incheon
 July 19–26: 2014 IPC Shooting World Championships in  Suhl
  won both the gold and overall medal tallies.
 July 26 – August 3: 2014 European Para-Archery Championships in  Nottwil
  won the gold medal tally.  won the overall medal tally.
 August 1–10: 2014 IWRF World Wheelchair Rugby Championships in  Odense
  defeated , 67–56, to claim its first wheelchair rugby title. The  won the bronze medal.
 August 4–10: 2014 IPC Swimming European Championships in  Eindhoven
  won the gold medal tally.  won the overall medal tally.
 August 16–24: 2014 IFDS Combined World Championships at the Royal Nova Scotia Yacht Squadron in  Halifax
 Sonar winner: Team  (Bruno Jourdren – Helmsman)
 SKUD 18 winner: Team  (Daniel Fitzgibbon – Helmsman)
 2.4mR winner: Team  (Heiko Kroeger – Helmsman)
 Nations Cup winner: 
 August 18–23: 2014 IPC Athletics European Championships in  Swansea
  won both the gold and overall medal tallies.
 August 28 – September 1: 2014 UCI Para-Cycling World Championships (road) in  Greenville, South Carolina
 For all the results, click here.
 August 30: 2014 ITU Paratriathlon World Championships in  Edmonton (part of the overall ITU Grand Final Series event)
 Men:  won 3 overall medals (2 golds included).
 Women:  won both the gold and overall medal tallies.
 September 6–15: 2014 ITTF Para Table Tennis World Championships in  Beijing
 For single events results, click here.
 For team events results, click here.
 October 18–24: 2014 Asian Para Games in  Incheon
  won both the gold and overall medal tallies.

Polo
 January 6–19: 2014 Snow Polo World Cup Finals in  Tianjin
  England defeated  6–5.

Road cycling

Rowing

Rugby league

7 February: Super League XIX begins with the Huddersfield Giants upsetting last year's champions Wigan Warriors at the DW Stadium in Wigan, England.
14 & 15 February: Inaugural NRL Auckland Nines are held at Eden Park in Auckland, New Zealand. The North Queensland Cowboys are inaugural champions after beating Brisbane 16–7 in the final.
22 February: Sydney Roosters win the 2014 World Club Challenge after beating Wigan Warriors 36–14 at Allianz Stadium in Sydney, Australia.
25 February: Europe's Bradford Bulls team are deducted six Super League competition points after entering administration.
6 March: 2014 NRL season begins with the South Sydney Rabbitohs upsetting last year's champions Sydney Roosters at the ANZ Stadium in Sydney.
2 May: The 2014 ANZAC Test is played, with Australia defeating New Zealand 30–18 before 25,429 at Allianz Stadium.
3 May: The Pacific Rugby League International is played, with Samoa defeating Fiji 32–16 before 9,063 at Sportingbet Stadium in Penrith, Australia. In doing so they also secured qualification as the fourth and final team to compete at the 2014 Four Nations later in the year.
14 June: 2014 State of Origin series i won by New South Wales after losing 8 consecutive. New South Wales won the historic third-match in the series 6–4 before 83,421 at ANZ Stadium in Sydney, New South Wales.
23 August: The 2014 Challenge Cup final is played, with the Leeds Rhinos defeating the Castleford Tigers 23–10 before 77,914 at Wembley Stadium.
5 October: 2014 NRL Grand Final is played and South Sydney are the new premiers after defeating the Canterbury Bulldogs 30–6 in front of a record 'Rectangular Shaped (ANZ) Stadium' crowd of 83,833 at ANZ Stadium in Sydney.
11 October: 2014 Super League Grand Final is played and St. Helens are the new champions after defeating a '12-man' Wigan Warriors team 14–6 before 70,102 at Old Trafford in Strentford, England.
2 November: 2014 European Cup is won by Scotland for the first time. Scotland have therefore qualified to play alongside Australia, England and New Zealand in the 2016 Four Nations.
15 November: 2014 Four Nations Final is won by New Zealand who defeated Australia 22–18 before 25,093 at Westpac Stadium in Wellington, New Zealand.
19 December: New Zealand halfback, Shaun Johnson is announced as the best official player in 2014 after being awarded the Golden Boot.

Rugby union

 October 10, 2013 – May 23, 2014: 2013–14 European Challenge Cup
  Northampton Saints defeated fellow English team of Bath, 30–16, to claim its second title.
 October 11, 2013 – May 24, 2014: 2013–14 Heineken Cup
 In the last-ever Heineken Cup final,  Toulon defeated  Saracens 23–6 to claim its second consecutive title. The Heineken Cup was replaced the following season by the new European Rugby Champions Cup.
 October 12, 2013 – May 11, 2014: 2013–14 IRB Sevens World Series
  winning the Sevens World Series for the 12th time beating  by 28 points in the overall standings.  came in third.
 November 28, 2013 – May 17, 2014: 2013–14 IRB Women's Sevens World Series
  winning the IRB Women's Sevens World Series for the second time beating  by 4 points in the overall standings.  came in third.
 February 1 – March 15: 2014 Six Nations Championship
 Champions:  (12th title)
 Triple Crown winner:  (24th title)
 Calcutta Cup winner: 
 Millennium Trophy winner: 
 Centenary Quaich winner: 
 Giuseppe Garibaldi Trophy winner: 
 February 15 – August 2: 2014 Super Rugby season
 The  Waratahs defeated the  Crusaders, 33–32, to claim its first Super Rugby title.
 April 7 – 19: 2014 IRB Junior World Rugby Trophy in 
  defeated , 35–10, in the final. The  took third place.
 June 2–20: 2014 IRB Junior World Championship in  Auckland
  defeated , 21–20, to claim its second title.  took third place.
 June 7–21: 2014 IRB Pacific Nations Cup
 Asia/Pacific Conference winner: 
 Pacific Islands Conference winner: 
 August 1–17: 2014 Women's Rugby World Cup in France
  defeated , 21–9, to claim its second Women's Rugby World Cup win. Host nation, took third place.
 August 16 – October 4: 2014 Rugby Championship
 Champions:  (13th title overall, third in Rugby Championship era)
 Bledisloe Cup winner: New Zealand
 Freedom Cup winner: New Zealand
 Mandela Challenge Plate winner: 
 Puma Trophy winner: 
 August 17–20: 2014 Summer Youth Olympics
 Boys:  ;  ;  
 Girls:  ;  ;

Sailing

Shooting
 January 2 – December 3: 2014 ISSF Calendar of Events
 March 26 – October 28: ISSF World Cup
 March 26 – April 3: First ISSF WC for the Rifle and Pistol at  Fort Benning
  and  won 2 gold medals each.  and Russia won 6 overall medals each.
 April 8 – 15: First ISSF WC for the Shotgun only at  Tucson
 Five different national teams have won one gold medal each. However, host  won the overall medal tally.
 May 16 – 25: Second ISSF WC for the Shotgun only at  Almaty
  won both the gold and overall medal tallies.
 June 4–13: First ISSF WC for all Three Guns at  Munich
  won both the gold and overall medal tallies.
 June 13–21: Second ISSF WC for the Rifle and Pistol at  Maribor
  and  won 3 gold medals each. However, China won the overall medal tally.
 July 1–10: Second ISSF WC for all Three Guns at  Beijing
 Host nation, won both the gold and overall medal tallies.
 October 21–28: Final World Cup for all Three Guns at  Gabala
  won the gold medal tally.  won the overall medal tally.
 May 26 – June 1: ISSF Junior Cup at  Suhl
  and  won 4 gold medals each. However, Russia won the overall medal tally.
 August 17–22: 2014 Summer Youth Olympics
 Boys' 10m Air Pistol:   Pavlo Korostylov;   KIM Cheongyong;   Edouard Dortomb
 Boys' 10m Air Rifle:   YANG Haoran;   Hrachik Babayan;   Istvan Peni
 Girls' 10m Air Pistol:   Agata Nowak;   Margarita Lomova;   KIM Minjung
 Girls' 10m Air Rifle:   Sarah Hornung;   Martina Lindsay Veloso;   Julia Budde
 Mixed 10m Air Pistol:   Nencheva /  Svechnikov;   Mohamed /  Teh;   Madrid /  Rasmane
 Mixed 10m Air Rifle:   Mekhimar /  Peni;   Russo /  Valdes Martinez;   Lu /  Sukhorukova
 September 6–20: 2014 ISSF World Shooting Championships at  Granada
  won both the gold and overall medal tallies.
 October 13–19: CAT American Championships 2014 in  Guadalajara
 Men's 50m Rifle 3 Positions winner:  Alexander Molerio Quintana
 Men's 50m Rifle Prone winner:  Reinier Estpinan
 Men's 10m Air Rifle winner:  Dempster Christenson
 Men's 50m Pistol winner:  Jorge Grau Potrille
 Men's 25m Rapid Fire Pistol winner:  Leuris Pupo
 Men's 10m Air Pistol winner:  Will Brown
 Men's Trap winner:  Eduardo Lorenzo
 Men's Double Trap winner:  Sergio Pinero
 Men's Skeet winner:  Vincent Hancock
 Women's 50m Rifle 3 Positions winner:  Eglys Yahima de la Cruz
 Women's 10m Air Rifle winner:  Eglys Yahima de la Cruz
 Women's 25m Pistol winner:  Andrea Perez Peña
 Women's 10m Air Pistol winner:  Lilian Castro
 Women's Trap winner:  Ashley Carroll
 Women's Skeet winner:  Amber English

Ski jumping

Snowboarding

Softball
 January 16 – December 2014: WBSC Calendar of Events
 January 16–19: Men's International Fast Pitch Tournament in  Altamonte Springs, Florida
 Sureño Soy defeated Team USA 1–0 in the final.
 May 29 – June 4: 2014 NCAA Women's College World Series in Oklahoma City
 The  Florida Gators defeated the  Alabama Crimson Tide 2–0 (out of 3 matches), to claim its first NCAA title.
 July 11–20: 2014 ISF Junior Men's World Championship in  Whitehorse
 Team  defeated , 9–0, to claim its second consecutive World Junior Softball Championship title.  took the bronze medal.
 August 3–9: 2014 Big League Softball World Series and Senior League Softball World Series both in Sussex County, Delaware
 Big League: Team USA East (represented by the roster from  Milford) defeated fellow Delaware District 3 Host Team (represented by the roster from Laurel), 1–0, in the final match.
 Senior League: Team USA Central (represented by the roster from  South Bend) defeated Team USA West (represented by the roster from  Missoula) 5–0, in the final match.
 August 7–13: 2014 Little League Softball World Series in Portland, Oregon
 Team East (represented by the roster from  Robbinsville) defeated Team Southwest (represented by the roster from  Bossier City), 4–1, in the final match.
 August 10–16: 2014 Junior League Softball World Series in Kirkland, Washington
 Team USA East (represented by the West Point Little League team from  Greensburg) defeated Team Latin America (represented by the Mexicali Municipal Little League team from  Mexicali), 6–2, in the final match.
 August 15–24: 2014 Women's Softball World Championship in  Haarlem

Speed skating

Squash

Table tennis

Taekwondo

Tennis

 December 30, 2013 – October 27, 2014: 2014 WTA Tour
 December 29, 2013 – November 9, 2014: 2014 ATP World Tour

Grand Slam
 January 13–26: 2014 Australian Open
 Men's winner:  Stanislas Wawrinka (first Australian Open and Grand Slam title)
 Women's winner:  Li Na (first Australian Open win; second Grand Slam title)
 May 25 – June 8: 2014 French Open
 Men's winner:  Rafael Nadal (ninth French Open title win; 14th overall Grand Slam title win; already achieved the Career Golden Slam in 2010)
 Women's winner:  Maria Sharapova (second French Open title win; fifth overall Grand Slam title win; already achieved the Career Grand Slam in 2012)
 June 23 – July 6: 2014 Wimbledon Championships
 Men's winner:  Novak Djokovic (second Wimbledon title win; 7th overall Grand Slam title win)
 Women's winner:  Petra Kvitová (second Wimbledon and Grand Slam title win)
 August 25 – September 8: 2014 US Open
 Men's winner:  Marin Čilić (first US Open and Grand Slam win)
 Women's winner:  Serena Williams (sixth US Open win; 18th overall Grand Slam title win; already achieved the Super Slam and Career Golden Slam in 2012)

Other
 December 28, 2013 – January 4, 2014: 2014 Hopman Cup
  France defeated  Poland 2–1, to claim its first title.
 December 29, 2013 – October 13, 2014: ATP World Tour 250 series
 Most wins:  Marin Čilić (3)
 December 30, 2013 – October 19, 2014: 2014 WTA Premier tournaments
 Most wins:  Serena Williams (5)
 December 30, 2013 – November 23, 2014: 2014 ATP Challenger Tour
 Most wins:  Adrian Mannarino and  Gilles Müller (5 wins each)
 January 31 – November 23: 2014 Davis Cup
  defeated , 3–1 in matches won, to win its first Davis Cup title.
 February 8 – November 9: 2014 Fed Cup
 The  defeated , 3–1 in matches won, to win its eighth Fed Cup title.
 February 10 – October 26: 2014 ATP World Tour 500 series
 Most wins:  Kei Nishikori and  Roger Federer (2 wins each)
 March 6 – November 2: 2014 ATP World Tour Masters 1000
 Most wins:  Novak Djokovic (4)
 August 17–24: 2014 Summer Youth Olympics
 Boys' Singles:   Kamil Adrian Majchrzak;   Orlando Moraes Luz;   Andrey Rublev
 Boys' Doubles:   Orlando Moraes Luz / Marcelo Zormann Silva;   Karen Khachanov / Andrey Rublev;   Ryotaro Matsumura / Jumpei Yamasaki
 Girls' Singles:   Xu Shilin;   Iryna Shymanovich;   Akvile Parazinskaite
 Girls' Doubles:   Anhelina Kalinina and  Iryna Shymanovich;   Daria Kasatkina / Anastasiya Komardina;   Jeļena Ostapenko and  Akvile Parazinskaite
 Mixed doubles:   Jumpei Yamasaki and  Ye Qiuyu;   Jil Teichmann and  Jan Stanislaw Zieliński;   Kamil Adrian Majchrzak and  Fanni Ivett Stollar
 October 20–26: 2014 WTA Finals in 
 Singles winner:  Serena Williams
 Doubles winners:  Cara Black /  Sania Mirza
 November 9–16: 2014 ATP World Tour Finals in  London
  Novak Djokovic won the final by default because  Roger Federer withdrew from the match, due to back injury.
 November 19–23: 2014 ATP Challenger Tour Finals in  São Paulo
 Winner:  Diego Schwartzman (first ATP Challenger Tour Finals win)

Track cycling

Triathlon

Volleyball

Water polo

Weightlifting

Whitewater (canoe) slalom

Wrestling

References

 
Sports by year